There are over 20,000 Grade II* listed buildings in England. This page is a list of these buildings in the district of Maidstone in Kent.

Maidstone

|}

See also
 Grade I listed buildings in Maidstone
 List of scheduled monuments in Maidstone

Notes

External links

Lists of Grade II* listed buildings in Kent
Grade II* listed buildings in Kent
Borough of Maidstone